Bulgy the Whale is a children's amusement ride manufactured by Eyerly Aircraft Company. It consists of eight whale-shaped ride vehicles traveling in a counter-clockwise rotation, similar to a carousel, while traveling up and down small hills. Although the Eyerly Aircraft Company ceased operation in the 1980s, there are still several Bulgy the Whale rides in operation. Some have had their whales repainted to resemble fish instead of whales, and others have had thematic pieces added, but the general operation and idea remains the same.

Bulgy the Whale Installations 
Below is a partial list of Bulgy the Whale attractions.

References

Amusement rides